Kois is a surname of Polish origin. Notable people with the surname include:

Dennis Kois, American graphic designer
Valeri Kois (born 1950), Estonian politician

See also
Kois v. Wisconsin

References

Surnames of Polish origin